Jo Jeeta Wohi Super Star 
is an Indian reality television series which aims to bring the winners of 'all' singing reality shows completed previously and the runners-up together competed for the 'Superstar' title under 'one roof'. The series' grand-finale took place on 12 July 2008, Rahul Vaidya emerged as the winner

Cast

Host 
 Mandira Bedi

Judges
 Farah Khan
 Vishal–Shekhar

Participants
 In this show, one player from Challenger team will cross over to champions team every Saturday on the basis Of Judges's score of Friday episode.

Guest appearances
Shaan
Mika Singh
Mahalakshmi Iyer
Udit Narayan
Harman Baweja
Sukhwinder Singh
Richa Sharma

Grand Finale
Neeraj Shridhar
Sonu Nigam
Bipasha Basu
Vidya Balan
Shahid Kapoor

Guest from Star Parivaar
 Hussain Kuwajerwala ... Kumkum (a.k.a. Sumit Wadhawa)
 Juhi Parmar ... Kumkum (a.k.a. Kumkum Wadhawa)
 Parul Chauhan ... Sapna Babul Ka...Bidaai (a.k.a. Ragini Khanna)
 Ishita Dhawan ... Sapna Babul Ka...Bidaai (a.k.a. Maalti Khanna)
 Angad Hasija ... Sapna Babul Ka...Bidaai (a.k.a. Alekh Rajvansh)
 Sarita Joshi ... Baa Bahoo Aur Baby (a.k.a. Godavari Thakker)
 Lubna Salim ... Baa Bahoo Aur Baby (a.k.a. Leela Thakker)
 Kamlesh Oza ... Baa Bahoo Aur Baby (a.k.a. Hemal Thakker)
 Ali Hasan ... Great Indian Laughter Challenge
 Irfan Malik ... Great Indian Laughter Challenge
 Kapil Sharma ... Great Indian Laughter Challenge
 Chandan Prabhakar ... Great Indian Laughter Challenge
 Aishwariya Majumdar ... Amul Star Voice of India' (Winner)
 Anwesha Datta Gupta ... Amul Star Voice of India' (Runner Up)
 Harshad Chopda as Prem Juneja from Kis Desh Mein Hai Meraa Dil
 Additi Gupta ... Kis Desh Mein Hai Meraa Dil (a.k.a. Heer Maan / Juneja)

Second Season
Main Page: Jo Jeeta Wohi Super Star 2

The second season of Jo Jeeta Wohi Superstar started broadcasting on March 31, 2012. The judges are Shantanu Moitra, Swanand Kirkire, and Shaan.
The Contestants are

Champions
 Aneek Dhar
 Sreeram Chandra
 Hemant Brijwasi
 Akanksha Sharma
 Sanchita Bhattacharya
 Vaishali Mhade

Challengers
 Sharib Sabri
 Mohammed Irfan
 Anweshaa Datta Gupta
 Rehman Ali
 Shivamm Pathak
 Sonia Sharma
 Harpreet Deol
 Rajdeep Chatterjee
 Torsha Sarkar
 Nihira Joshi

See also
 Jo Jeeta Wohi Super Star 2

References
 Jo Jeeta Wohi Superstar Profile, Updates, Mock Polls & Forums at Jeetega Kaun

External links
 Official Site
 Latest Updates - Jo Jeeta Wohi Super Star Season 2

2008 Indian television series debuts
Indian reality television series